Code page 1015 (CCSID 1015), also known as CP1015, is IBM's code page for the Portuguese version of ISO 646 for Portugal.

Code page layout

See also 
ISO 646
DEC National Replacement Character Set (NRCS)

References 

1015